The Southeast Water Pollution Control Plant, also called the Southeast Treatment Plant, is a wastewater treatment plant operated by the San Francisco Public Utilities Commission, in San Francisco, California, United States.  It is located in the southeastern portion of the city in the Bayview-Hunters Point neighborhood.

Southeast is the city's primary treatment plant handling about 80% of the city's wastewater from the eastern two-thirds of the city's residents. The facility discharges treated water about  into San Francisco Bay. Constructed in 1952, the  facility is planned to be updated with new digesters by the mid-2020s.

See also
 San José–Santa Clara Regional Wastewater Facility

References

External links
 Official website

Sewage treatment plants in California
Government buildings in San Francisco
Government of San Francisco
Environment of the San Francisco Bay Area
San Francisco Bay watershed
1952 establishments in California